The 2023 Copa Libertadores qualifying stages were played from 7 February to 16 March 2023. A total of 19 teams competed in the qualifying stages to decide four of the 32 places in the group stage of the 2023 Copa Libertadores.

Draw

The draw for the qualifying stages was held on 21 December 2022, 12:00 PYST (UTC−3), at the CONMEBOL Convention Centre in Luque, Paraguay.

Teams were seeded by their CONMEBOL Clubs ranking as of 9 December 2022 (shown in parentheses), taking into account the following three factors:
Performance in the last 10 years, taking into account Copa Libertadores and Copa Sudamericana results in the period 2013–2022.
Historical coefficient, taking into account Copa Libertadores and Copa Sudamericana results in the period 1960–2012 and 2002–2012 respectively.
Local tournament champion, with bonus points awarded to domestic league champions of the last 10 years.

For the first stage, the six teams were drawn into three ties (E1–E3), with the teams from Pot 1 hosting the second leg.

For the second stage, the 16 teams were drawn into eight ties (C1–C8), with the teams from Pot 1 hosting the second leg. Teams from the same association could not be drawn into the same tie, excluding the three winners of the first stage, which were seeded in Pot 2 and whose identity was not known at the time of the draw, and could be drawn into the same tie with another team from the same association.

For the third stage, the eight winners of the second stage were allocated without any draw into the following four ties (G1–G4), with the team in each tie with the higher CONMEBOL ranking hosting the second leg.

Second stage winner C1 vs. Second stage winner C8
Second stage winner C2 vs. Second stage winner C7
Second stage winner C3 vs. Second stage winner C6
Second stage winner C4 vs. Second stage winner C5

Format

In the qualifying stages, each tie was played on a home-and-away two-legged basis. If tied on aggregate, extra time would not be played, and a penalty shoot-out would be used to determine the winner (Regulations Article 2.4.3).

Bracket

The qualifying stages are structured as follows:
First stage (6 teams): The three winners of the first stage advance to the second stage to join the 13 teams which are given byes to the second stage.
Second stage (16 teams): The eight winners of the second stage advance to the third stage.
Third stage (8 teams): The four winners of the third stage advance to the group stage to join the 28 direct entrants. The four teams eliminated in the third stage enter the Copa Sudamericana group stage.
The bracket was decided based on the first stage draw and second stage draw, which was held on 21 December 2022.

Winner G1

Winner G2

Winner G3

Winner G4

First stage
The first legs were played on 7–9 February, and the second legs were played on 14–16 February 2023.

|}

Match E1

Nacional won 4–3 on aggregate and advanced to the second stage (Match C2).

Match E2

El Nacional won 9–2 on aggregate and advanced to the second stage (Match C4).

Match E3

Boston River won 4–1 on aggregate and advanced to the second stage (Match C7).

Second stage
The first legs were played on 21–23 February, and the second legs were played on 28 February – 2 March 2023.

|}

Match C1

Atlético Mineiro won 3–1 on aggregate and advanced to the third stage (Match G1).

Match C2

Sporting Cristal won 5–3 on aggregate and advanced to the third stage (Match G2).

Match C3

Fortaleza won 4–0 on aggregate and advanced to the third stage (Match G3).

Match C4

Independiente Medellín won 4–3 on aggregate and advanced to the third stage (Match G4).

Match C5

Magallanes won 6–1 on aggregate and advanced to the third stage (Match G4).

Match C6

Cerro Porteño won 2–0 on aggregate and advanced to the third stage (Match G3).

Match C7

Huracán won 1–0 on aggregate and advanced to the third stage (Match G2).

Match C8

Millonarios won 2–1 on aggregate and advanced to the third stage (Match G1).

Third stage
The first legs were played on 8–9 March, and the second legs were played on 15–16 March 2023.

|}

Match G1

Atlético Mineiro won 4–2 on aggregate and advanced to the group stage.

Match G2

Sporting Cristal won 1–0 on aggregate and advanced to the group stage.

Match G3

Cerro Porteño won 3–1 on aggregate and advanced to the group stage.

Match G4

Independiente Medellín won 3–1 on aggregate and advanced to the group stage.

Notes

References

External links
CONMEBOL Libertadores 2023, CONMEBOL.com

1
February 2023 sports events in South America
March 2023 sports events in South America